''Astatotilapia'' sp. 'shovelmouth' is a putative, formally undescribed species of freshwater fish in the family Cichlidae. It is endemic to Lake Victoria in Uganda.  It was previously included in the IUCN Red List of Threatened Species as an endangered species, but omitted from more recent lists.

References

Astatotilapia
Undescribed vertebrate species
Endemic freshwater fish of Uganda
Cichlid fish of Africa
Taxonomy articles created by Polbot